Dal Mardan Shah was the king of the Malla state of Patan in Nepal (r. 1764-1765). He was the son of Nara Bhupal Shah and the younger brother of Prithvi Narayan Shah.

References

Gurkhas
Nepalese Hindus